Acacia incognita, also known as false sugar brother, is a shrub or tree belonging to the genus Acacia and the subgenus Juliflorae that is endemic to Western Australia.

Description
It has slightly crooked stems that are not fluted with fissured on present on the main stems and the upper branches. It has resinous new shoots with scattered reddish glandular hairlets. The glabrous branchlets can have some hairs between the non-resinous ribs. Like most species of Acacia it has phyllodes rather than true leaves.

Distribution
It is native to an area in the Mid West region of Western Australia from around Mullewa in the west through to around Yalgoo in the east and to around Karara Station to the north of Morawa in the south. It is often situated on plains or low rises growing in loam or loamy clay soils as a part of Eucalyptus woodland communities or Melaleuca shrubland communities.

See also
List of Acacia species

References

incognita
Acacias of Western Australia
Taxa named by Bruce Maslin